Legarreta is a surname. Notable people with the surname include: 

Andrea Legarreta (born 1972), Mexican actress and television presenter
Germán Legarreta (born 1981), American actor
Luis María de Larrea y Legarreta (1918–2009), Spanish Catholic bishop

See also
Legorreta (surname)